The official language of Botswana is English, while Tswana is considered to be a national language. English, which was inherited from colonial rule, is the language of official business and most written communication. Most of the population speak Tswana, but over 20 smaller languages are also spoken. Some of the country's languages are in danger of becoming extinct.

Official and national languages 
The official written language of Botswana is English. Most written communication and official business texts are written in English. The language of the Tswana people—Setswana—is the country's national language, and is spoken by most of the population.

Other languages 
Aside from English and Setswana, other languages are spoken in the country. Over 90% of the population speak a Bantu language as their first language. According to the CIA's World Factbook, the most common Bantu languages spoken are Setswana (73.3% of the population), Kalanga (17.2%), Kgalagadi (2.4%), Shona (1%) Mbukushu (1.6%) and Ndebele (1%). 1.7% speak Tshwa (a Khoe language) and 0.1% speak !Xóõ, a Tuu language (both non-Bantu). English is spoken by 2.8% as their first language, and a small number speak Afrikaans.

The number of individual languages listed for Botswana is 31. All are living languages. Of these, 26 are indigenous and 5 are non-indigenous. Furthermore, 4 are institutional, 9 are developing, 8 are vigorous, 9 are in trouble, and 1 is dying.

Languages spoken 

 Afrikaans
 Ani
 Birwa
 Chichewa
 English
 Gana
 Gciriku
 Gwi
 Hai||om
 Herero
‡Hua
Ju|’hoansi
Kalanga
Kgalagadi
Khoekhoe
Khwedam
Kua
Kuhane
Kung-Ekoka
Lozi
Mbukushu
Nambya
Naro
Ndebele
Setswana
Shua
Tshuwau
Tswapong
!Xóõ
Yeyi
Zezuru
isiXhosa

References

Sources

Further reading

See also
Khoisan languages

External links
 Ethnologue listing of Botswana languages 
 A list of endangered languages in Botswana from the Endangered Languages Project (ELP)
 The Kalahari Basin area: a 'Sprachbund' on the verge of extinction, from the Kalahari Basin area project (KBA)